Phyxelididae is a family of araneomorph spiders first described by Pekka T. Lehtinen in 1967 as a subfamily of Amaurobiidae, and later elevated to family status as a sister group of Titanoecidae.

Genera

, the World Spider Catalog accepts the following genera:

Ambohima Griswold, 1990 — Madagascar
Kulalania Griswold, 1990 — Kenya
Lamaika Griswold, 1990 — South Africa
Malaika Lehtinen, 1967 — South Africa
Manampoka Griswold, Wood & Carmichael, 2012 — Madagascar
Matundua Lehtinen, 1967 — South Africa
Namaquarachne Griswold, 1990 — South Africa
Phyxelida Simon, 1894 — Africa, Asia
Pongolania Griswold, 1990 — South Africa
Rahavavy Griswold, Wood & Carmichael, 2012 — Madagascar
Themacrys Simon, 1906 — South Africa
Vidole Lehtinen, 1967 — South Africa, Lesotho
Vytfutia Deeleman-Reinhold, 1986 — Indonesia
Xevioso Lehtinen, 1967 — Africa

Gallery

See also
 Titanoecoidea

References

 

 
Araneomorphae families
Taxa named by Pekka T. Lehtinen